Burara jaina, the orange awlet, is a species of hesperid butterfly found in Asia. The butterfly was reassigned to the genus Burara by Vane-Wright and de Jong (2003), and is considered Burara jaina by them.

Range
The orange awlet is found in India, Myanmar, Thailand and Vietnam.

In India, this butterfly is found in the Western Ghats and the Himalayas from Garhwal (Mussoorie) to Sikkim and Assam eastwards to Myanmar.

The type locality is Darjeeling in West Bengal, India.

Status
It is fairly common in Kodagu and Thenmala but rare elsewhere in India.

Description

Both sexes: The butterfly, which has a wingspan of 60 to 70 mm, is a dark vinaceous (colour of red wine) brown above. The forewing has an orange costal streak from the base above the cell to about halfway along the wing, while the hindwing has an orange fringe. The butterfly is paler below and has orange bands along the veins of the hindwing.

Male: The male may have an indistinct dark brand placed centrally on the forewing above, between mid 1b to vein 3.

Edward Yerbury Watson (1891) gives a detailed description, shown below:

Habits
The orange-striped awl is an insect of the low foothills with dense jungles and heavy rainfall. It is rarely seen out of such terrain. Crepuscular in nature, it flies early in the mornings or late in the evenings. It has strong, fast and straight flight. It is best seen in ravines and nullahs. It hovers at leaves and visits Lantana and other attractive flowers.

Host plants
The larva has been recorded on Hiptage benghalensis and Combretum latifolium.

Cited references

See also
Coeliadinae
Hesperiidae
List of butterflies of India (Coeliadinae)
List of butterflies of India (Hesperiidae)

References

Print

Watson, E. Y. (1891) Hesperiidae indicae. Vest and Co. Madras.

Online

Brower, Andrew V. Z. and Warren, Andrew, (2007). Coeliadinae Evans 1937. Version 21 February 2007 (temporary). http://tolweb.org/Coeliadinae/12150/2007.02.21 in The Tree of Life Web Project, http://tolweb.org/

Bibasis
Butterflies described in 1865
Butterflies of Asia
Taxa named by Frederic Moore